Absolute Cobblers is a game show, based on an Australian format, that aired for one series on Challenge TV in 1999. It was hosted by Sean Meo and Wynnie La Freak. The idea of the show is that the host had to read out something and panellists have to decide whether it was true or 'absolute cobblers'. They would then throw the question out to the studio audience to see what they thought, with the chance of winning things in the process.

External links

Wynnie La Freak's profile on Dragact

British panel games
1990s British game shows
1999 British television series debuts
1999 British television series endings